Spectinabilin is a nitrophenyl-substituted polyketide metabolite. It was first isolated from crude streptovaricin complex produced by Streptomyces spectabilis and presented at the 13th Interscience Conference on Antimicrobial Agents and Chemotherapy in Washington, D.C. in September 1973.  Spectinabilin is a biologically active compound, exhibiting both antimalarial and antiviral activity. Biosynthesis 
Production of spectinabilin occurs through a type one polyketide synthase, and is regulated differently in S. spectabilis and Streptomyces orinoci despite being nearly identical gene clusters.  The biosynthesis of Spectinabillin initially requires 4 open reading frames (ORF) for the production of the starter unit,  p-nitrobenzoic acid (pNBA) from chorismate.  pNBA is then loaded onto the polyketide synthase, and undergoes 6 rounds of elongation and reduction.  Briefly, pNBA is loaded onto the PKA and elongated by methyl malonyl-coa (mmCoA), which is then reduced twice to afford the enone. This elongation and subsequent reduction is then repeated three additional times with another unit of mmCoA.  The final mmCoA loaded in the sequence is completely reduced to saturation.  Malonyl CoA (mCoA) is then loaded, followed by two additional units of mmCoA.  Then,  the previously loaded mCoA cyclizes with the most recently loaded mmCoA as a result of the terminal thioesterase(TE) domain to form a 6 membered terminal ring of the spectinabillin intermediate.  The alcohol of the ring  is then methylated.  A furan is then formed via oxidation and subsequent cyclization catalyzed by a Cyt p-450 monoxygenase to afford spectinabillin.

 References 

 Further reading Cloning and heterologous expression of the spectinabilin biosynthetic gene cluster from Streptomyces spectabilis - Molecular Biosystems, 2010;6(2):336-338 - Choi et al."Studies from University of Illinois in the area of cloning published." Pharma Business Week. NewsRX. 2010. Retrieved May 23, 2014 from HighBeam ResearchIsolation and structure elucidation of a novel androgen antagonist, arabilin, produced by Streptomyces sp. MK756-CF1 - Journal of Antibiotics, 2010;63(10):601-5 - Kawamura et al''."Scientists at Keio University target hormones." Biotech Week. NewsRX. 2010. Retrieved May 23, 2014 from HighBeam Research

Polyketide antibiotics
Nitro compounds
Polyenes